Peter Levy may refer to:
Peter Levy (cinematographer), Australian cinematographer
Peter Levy (presenter) (born 1955), British TV and radio presenter

See also
Peter Levi (1931–2000), professor of poetry